Domani mi sposo (also known as  Tomorrow I'm Getting Married) is a 1984 Italian romantic comedy film directed by Francesco Massaro.

Plot
Last twenty-four hours before the marriage for the troubled, tempted, overwhelmed by events Arturo.

Cast

 Jerry Calà: Arturo Righetti
 Isabella Ferrari: Susy
 Milly Carlucci: Simona
 Karina Huff: Rita 
 Guido Nicheli: Gastone
 Claudio Bisio: Attilio aka Volver

References

External links
 

1984 films
Italian romantic comedy films
1980s Italian-language films
1984 romantic comedy films
Films directed by Francesco Massaro
1980s Italian films